Interline Bus Services is an Australian bus company operating services in South West Sydney.

History
Interline Bus Services was formed when the Oliveri family purchased route 102 Campbelltown Hospital - Macquarie Fields from Herbert Harrison on 1 September 1961.

On 1 June 1989, it merged with Oliveri's Transport Service, Green Valley with both renamed Metro-link Bus Lines. In August 1992, it was separated from Oliveri transport Services when the founding Oliveri families parted company and the family of the late John Oliveri acquired all the shares in Ingleburn Bus Services Pty Ltd and started trading as Interline Bus Services.

In August 2002, Southern Cross Transit, Karana Downs, was purchased by the Oliveri family and is now the sister company of Interline.

Since 2005 Interline's services have been part of Sydney Bus Region 2. On 1 June 2014, Interline commenced operating all services in the region including those previously operated by Busabout.

Routes
On 1 June 2014, Interline took over all Region 2 routes from Region 2 partner Busabout.

Fleet

In the 1980s the Ingleburn Bus Service fleet consisted of Bedford YMT3s and Leyland Super Vikings and Tigers, two of which were configured as coaches.

In the early 1990s ex ACTION Leyland Nationals, Transperth Leyland B21s and Urban Transit Authority Leyland Atlanteans were purchased. These were in turn replaced by ex ACTION Mercedes-Benz O305s and Renault PR100.2s. More recently new Volvos and Daewoos have been purchased.

Following the Oliveri family's purchase of Southern Cross Transit in August 2002, many Interline buses have been transferred for further service.

Ingleburn Bus Service had a light green and red livery that gave way to Metro-link's turquoise. Interline adopted a white and blue scheme.

In February 2021, Interline received their first electric buses, with ten BCI CitiRiders rolled out into service on two routes. Nine Yutong E12s later arrived from April 2021.

As of July 2022, the Interline fleet consists of 119 buses.

References

External links

Bus Australia gallery
Showbus gallery

Bus companies of New South Wales
Bus transport in Sydney
Transport companies established in 1961
Australian companies established in 1961